The 1966 Maine Black Bears football team was an American football team that represented the University of Maine as a member of the Yankee Conference during the 1966 NCAA College Division football season. In its 16th and final season under head coach Harold Westerman, the team compiled a 4–5 record (2–3 against conference opponents) and finished fourth out of the six teams in the Yankee Conference. John Huard and Charles Belisle were the team captains.

Schedule

References

Maine
Maine Black Bears football seasons
Maine Black Bears football